Mette Halvorsen (born 19 January 1965) is a Norwegian curler, two times world champion playing for the Norwegian national team with skip Dordi Nordby.

Olympics
Halvorsen participated at the demonstration event at the 1988 Winter Olympics, where the team finished third, and again at the demonstration event at the 1992 Winter Olympics, finishing second.

References

External links

 

Living people
1965 births
Norwegian female curlers
Curlers at the 1988 Winter Olympics
Curlers at the 1992 Winter Olympics
World curling champions
European curling champions